1050 aluminium alloy is an aluminium-based alloy in the "commercially pure" wrought family (1000 or 1xxx series). As a wrought alloy, it is not used in castings. Instead, it is usually formed by extrusion or rolling. It is commonly used in the electrical and chemical industries, on account of having high electrical conductivity, corrosion resistance, and workability. 1050 alloy is also sometimes used for the manufacture of heat sinks, since it has a higher thermal conductivity than other alloys. It has low mechanical strength compared to more significantly alloyed metals. It can be strengthened by cold working, but not by heat treatment.

Alternate names and designations include Al99.5, 3.0255, and A91050. It is described in the following standards:

 ASTM B 491: Standard Specification for Aluminium and Aluminium-Alloy Extruded Round Tubes for General-Purpose Applications
 ISO 6361: Wrought Aluminium and Aluminium Alloy Sheets, Strips and Plates

Chemical composition

The alloy composition of 1050 aluminium is:

 Aluminium: 99.5% min
 Copper: 0.05% max
 Iron: 0.4% max
 Magnesium: 0.05% max
 Manganese: 0.05% max
 Silicon: 0.25% max
 Titanium: 0.03% max
 Vanadium: 0.05% max
 Zinc: 0.05% max

References

Aluminium alloy table 

Aluminium alloys